A referendum on Black suffrage was held in New York in 1860. Voters were asked whether universal suffrage for Black men 21 years of age and older should be introduced. At the time, Black voters were required to meet certain property-owning criteria. Black men who owned the required amount of property could still vote in the state, and many did vote in the referendum.

The referendum question failed, with 64% voting against the change, and property restrictions to vote were maintained for Black voters. 

The referendum was most heavily supported by voters in Upstate New York. The Five Boroughs of New York City, as well as most of the area around the city, voted against the proposed amendment.

Using township level data, opponents of suffrage were correlated with higher amounts of Dutch Reformed adherents (mostly located along the Hudson Valley) as well as Irish and German immigrants (mostly located in New York City). Proponents tended to be evangelicals and those of New England birth. The areas that had most stridently supported suffrage also tended to have lower concentrations of Black residents, as well as having little history with slavery (which had been concentrated in the Hudson Valley and New York City when it was legal). These trends had been similar in the 1846 referendum on suffrage.

See also
New York state election, 1860
Universal suffrage
Constitution of New York

References

1860 referendums
Referendums in the United States
1860 in New York (state)
Suffrage referendums
African-American history of New York (state)
Pre-emancipation African-American history
History of African-American civil rights